The statue of Leonard Peltier, American Indian Movement activist and long-term prisoner, was created by political artist Rigo 23. The piece is based on a self-portrait of Peltier and was created to raise awareness of Peltier's Native American activism, artistry, and his 41 years in prison. The statue stands nine feet tall and is made of redwood and some steel. It includes a base measuring six feet by nine feet, modeled to match the dimensions of a standard prison cell.

Approved for placement on the grounds of the American University in Washington, D.C., in 2016, the statue was brought across the country for placement. On the way, it made stops in various locations such as Standing Rock, Pine Ridge, and Alcatraz Island. During its journey, over five hundred people stood on its feet to show their solidarity for Peltier.

On December 9, 2016, the statue was placed in front of the American University's Katzen Arts Center. Soon after the  president of the FBI Agents Association requested its removal. In January 2017, the statue was disassembled and removed from the campus by its administration who issued the statement:

The university has agreed to work alongside the artist to find another home for the statue.

https://www.ktvu.com/news/stolen-oakland-u-haul-contained-prized-leonard-peltier-statue

References

External links
Letter concerning the removal of the statue
Letter concerning the removal of the statue
Letter concerning the removal of the statue
 Image of statue

2016 sculptures
Removed statues
Sculptures of men in Washington, D.C.
Sculptures of Native Americans
Statues in Washington, D.C.
Wooden sculptures in the United States